James Jurdi is an American actor, screenwriter, and film producer. He is best known for his roles in the films Pocket Listing, Danger One, and Reaper.

Early life
James Jurdi was born in Los Angeles, California and is of Lebanese-American descent. He attended UCLA, where he studied cinema, playwriting, and performance arts.

Career
As a television actor, Jurdi has appeared in roles in The Bold and The Beautiful, Melrose Place, and General Hospital. Jurdi co-wrote the 2014 supernatural horror-thriller feature film Reaper; he also co-produced and played a role in the film. In 2015 he then wrote and acted in the role of Jack Woodman in the crime-thriller film Pocket Listing. Jurdi then acted in the 2018 film Danger One, a movie he also co-produced. In the film, he plays a paramedic that keeps a share of a million dollars that he and his partner find on a dying man they have been called to save. Jurdi is the cofounder of Mythmaker Productions.

References

Living people
University of California, Los Angeles alumni
American film producers
American male film actors
American male screenwriters
Male actors from Los Angeles
American male soap opera actors
American company founders
21st-century American male actors
Year of birth missing (living people)
21st-century American screenwriters
Screenwriters from California
Film producers from California
American people of Lebanese descent